Líðarnøva is a mountain range above the village of Sørvágur on the Faroe islands. Norðurvarði is placed on top of the mountain.

Mountains of the Faroe Islands